Zemlin (from земля meaning earth) is a Russian masculine surname, its feminine counterpart is Zemlina. It may refer to:

 Alexander Zemlin (born 1991), Russian sport shooter
 Matt Zemlin (born 1980), European actor, producer and director
 Viktor Zemlin (born 1964), Russian football player

See also
 Ziemlin, village in Poland

Russian-language surnames